Something About Faith Tour is a music concert tour by American R&B/soul singer, Faith Evans. The tour supports her album, Something About Faith, visiting 30 cities in North America and additional dates in Europe. The outing started on October 5 in New York at B.B. King’s Blues Club, the date her new album was released.

Opening Acts
Donell Jones (New Orleans, Detroit)
Jagged Edge (Detroit)
SWV (London)
Moments in Time (Chicago)

Set list
"Something About Faith" (Intro)
"Love Like This"
"Reasons"
"You Gets No Love"
"Burnin' Up"
"I Don't Need It"
"You Used to Love Me"
"Soon as I Get Home"
Biggie Smalls Tribute: DJ Set Interlude (contains elements of "One More Chance", "Big Poppa", "Hypnotize" and "Juicy")
Medley: "Party" / "Lucky Day" / "Brown Sugar (Extra Sweet)"
"Can't Believe"
"Come Over"
"Never Gonna Let You Go"
"Stop N Go"
"Mesmerized"
"All Night Long"
"I Love You"
"Tru Love"
"Again"
"Gone Already"

Tour dates

 Not all tour dates are listed

Festivals and other miscellaneous performances
Sweet Auburn Heritage Festival
For Sisters Only Expo
Budweiser Funk Fest
The Park Unplugged
Urban Legends Concert
Hillshire Farm Freedom Friday Party
Northwest Love Jam
Best of the 90s
16th Annual House Full of Toys Benefit Concert

Cancellations and rescheduled shows

References

External links
faithevansmusic.com
Faith Evans myspace page
Faith Evans Tour history

Faith Evans concert tours
2010 concert tours
2011 concert tours